The Revolutionary Socialist Student Federation was a militant student body in Great Britain launched in 1968.

References

External links 
 
Reproduced as: 

Political history of the United Kingdom
Student protests in the United Kingdom